These are the results of the 2010 IAAF Continental Cup, which took place in Split, Croatia on 4 and 5 September 2010.

Men

Track

Men's 100 metres

Men's 200 metres

Men's 400 metres

Men's 800 metres

Men's 1500 metres

Men's 3000 metres

Men's 5000 metres

Men's 110 metre hurdles

Men's 400 metre hurdles

Men's 3000 metre steeplechase

Men's 4 × 100 metres relay

Men's 4 × 400 metres relay

Field

Men's high jump

Men's pole vault

Men's long jump

Men's triple jump

Men's shot put

Men's discus throw

Men's hammer throw

Men's javelin throw

Women

Track

Women's 100 metres

Women's 200 metres

Women's 400 metres

Women's 800 metres

Women's 1500 metres

Women's 3000 metres

Women's 5000 metres

Women's 100 metre hurdles

Women's 400 metre hurdles

Women's 3000 metre steeplechase

Women's 4 × 100 metres relay

Women's 4 × 400 metres relay

Field

Women's high jump

Women's pole vault

Women's long jump

Women's triple jump

Women's shot put

Women's discus throw

Women's hammer throw

Women's javelin throw

References

Competition results
Results by Event. IAAF. Retrieved on 2010-09-05.

External links
Official IAAF competition website

IAAF World Cup results
Events at the IAAF Continental Cups